John Drummond (27 April 1723 – 25 July 1774) was an English banker and politician.

He was the oldest son of the banker Andrew Drummond (1688–1769), of Charing Cross in London and Stanmore in Middlesex.  His mother Isabella was the daughter  of Alexander Strachan, a London-Scottish merchant.  He was a cousin of Henry Drummond. Drummond was educated at Westminster School, and joined his father's Drummonds Bank.

He was married to Charlotte, daughter of Lord William Beauclerk. Their children included Jane Diana, Charlotte, John and George (see painting).

He was the Member of Parliament (MP) for Thetford from 1768 until his death in 1774.

References 
 

1723 births
1774 deaths
Bankers from London
People educated at Westminster School, London
Members of the Parliament of Great Britain for English constituencies
British MPs 1768–1774